Gustav Paul Closs (1840 – 1870) was a German landscape painter.

Life
Closs was born at Stuttgart in 1840, and received his first instructions in the School of Arts there under Funk, but afterwards studied in Rome, Naples, Munich, Paris, and other places. He also made a number of student-tours, especially to the Chiem-See in Bavaria, on the borders of which he died in 1870 at Prien. He produced a number of Italian views, and also published Illustrations to Wieland's Oberon, a magnificent volume entitled Truth and Fiction, and Uhland and his Home at Tübingen, the plates in which show the influence of Doré.

Works
His paintings included:

The Villa of Hadrian.
Road near Sorrento.
The Campagna near Borne.
Evening in the Villa Pamfili.
Cypresses in Tivoli.
Christmas Eve.
The Lonely Inn.
Autumn Night in the Park.

References

Sources
 

1840 births
1870 deaths
German landscape painters
Artists from Stuttgart
19th-century German painters
19th-century German male artists
German male painters